The 43rd News and Documentary Emmy Awards was presented by the National Academy of Television Arts and Sciences (NATAS), to honor the best in American news and documentary programming in 2021. The winners were announced on two ceremonies held at Palladium Times Square in New York City and live-streamed at Watch.TheEmmys.TV and other associated apps. The winners for the news categories were announced on September 28, 2022, while the ones for the documentary categories were revealed on September 29, 2022.

The nominees were announced on July 28, 2022, with Vice's news program VICE News Tonight and HBO's film unit HBO Documentary Films leading with 19 nominations each, while ABC was the most nominated network with 39. PBS NewsHours anchor and managing editor Judy Woodruff and filmmaker and biologist Sir David Attenborough received the Lifetime Achievement Award at the news and documentary ceremonies, respectively.

Winners and nominees
The nominees were announced on July 28, 2022. The winners are listed first and in bold.

Lifetime Achievement Award
 Judy Woodruff  (news)
 Sir David Attenborough'  (documentary)

News Programming

Spanish Language Programming

Documentary Programming

Craft

Regional News

Multiple nominations

Multiple wins

References

External links
 News & Documentary Emmys website

News and Documentary Emmy Awards
Emmy Awards
News & Documentary Emmy Awards